Aloe kilifiensis is a species of plant found on the shores around the Kenya–Tanzania border. It is threatened by the destruction of its habitat for agricultural purposes, and collected because of its flower's distinct coloring.

This species is one of the acaulescent, spotted aloes, and it is easily confused with the other spotted aloes of East Africa - especially Aloe lateritia and Aloe venusta. 
The leaves of Aloe kilifiensis are up to 9 cm wide. The perianth of its flowers is noticeably constricted above its base, and it has an inflorescence of five or more branches.

References 

kilifiensis
Flora of Kenya
Flora of Tanzania
Endangered flora of Africa
Plants described in 1942